Hamidou Benmessaoud (2 August 1935 – 19 September 2013), best known as Amidou, was a Moroccan-French film, television, and stage actor.

Born in Rabat, at 17 Amidou moved to Paris to attend the CNSAD. In 1968 he made his debut on stage, in Jean Genet's Les paravents. 

Amidou was best known for his association with director Claude Lelouch, with whom he shot eleven films, including Lelouch's film debut Le propre de l'homme (1960). He made his debut in a Moroccan film in 1969, starring in  Soleil de printemps directed by Latif Lahlou. His career included roles in Spaghetti Westerns like Buddy Goes West and several American productions, including William Friedkin's Sorcerer, John Frankenheimer's Ronin and  John Huston's Escape to Victory.

In 1969, Amidou was awarded best actor at the Rio de Janeiro International Film Festival for his role in Life Love Death by Claude Lelouch, and later won best actor awards at the Cairo Film Festival (for Pursuit by Leila Triquie) and at the Tangier Film Festival (for Rachid Boutounes' Here and There). In 2005 he received, from the hands of Martin Scorsese, a Lifetime Career Award at the International Film Festival of Marrakech. He was also the first Moroccan actor to have won an acting award at the National Conservatory of Dramatic Art.

Amidou died on 19 September 2013 in Paris, France, from an undisclosed illness.

Filmography

Le propre de l'homme (1961)
Une fille et des fusils (1965) - Amidou
The Grand Moments (1966) - Roger Amy
Brigade antigangs (1966) - Broken Nose
Live for Life (1967) - Photographer
Fleur d'oseille (1967) - Francis
La Fille d'en face (1968) - The seducer
La Chamade (1968) - Etienne
Life Love Death (1969) - François Toledo
Soleil de printemps (1969)
Le Voyou (1970) - Bill
Comptes à rebours (1971) - Macyas
Smic Smac Smoc (1971) - Smoc
La Poudre d'escampette (1971) - Ali
Trois milliards sans ascenseur (1972) - José
What a Flash! (1972)
La Punition (1973) - Raymond
La Valise (1973) - Lieutenant Abdul Fouad
Rosebud (1975) - Kirkbane
Sorcerer (1977) - Kassem / Martinez
Buddy Goes West (1981) - Girolamo / Eagle Eye
Escape to Victory (1981) - André
Les P'tites Têtes (1982) - Prince Douzami
Afghanistan pourquoi ? (1983)
La Nuit porte-jarretelles (1985)
Adieu Blaireau (1985) - Poupée
Catherine (1986) - Abou-al-Khayr (TV Series)
Champagne amer (1989) - Slim
L'union sacrée (1989) - Le Kabyle
There Were Days... and Moons (1990) - The incredulous policeman
La Belle Histoire (1992) - The shepherd
Day of Atonement (1992) - Si Ali
Unveiled (1994) - Det. Brahms
Lalla Hobby (1996) - Haj Moussa
Soleil (1997) - Mokzar
Ronin (1998) - Man at Exchange
Hideous Kinky (1998) - Sufi Sheikh
Rules of Engagement (2000) - Dr. Ahmar
Spy Game (2001) - Dr. Ahmed
And Now... Ladies and Gentlemen... (2002) - Police Inspector
Heaven's Doors (2006) - Mansour
Moussem lamchaoucha (2009) - Haj Lamfadel
Comme les cinq doigts de la main (2010) - Lakdar

Theater

References

External links 
 

1935 births
Moroccan male film actors
People from Rabat
2013 deaths
Moroccan emigrants to France
Moroccan male stage actors
Moroccan male television actors
French National Academy of Dramatic Arts alumni
20th-century Moroccan male actors
21st-century Moroccan male actors